Halenda is a village in Gujarat, India.

Geography
Halenda's altitude is 197 meters (649 feet).

Postal code
The postal code is 360032.

References 

Villages in Rajkot district